Dioscorea opposita  is an obsolete synonym of two species of yams:

 Chinese yam (Dioscorea polystachya), a widely cultivated yam native to China
 Dioscorea oppositifolia, a yam native to the Indian subcontinent

Species Latin name disambiguation pages
opposita